Potok Cave ( or Potočka zijavka) is a cave in northern Slovenia, declared a high-elevation archaeological and paleontological site, occupied approximately 35,000 years BP (before present) by anatomically modern humans of the Aurignacian culture during the Upper Paleolithic. The cave is named after the Potok Farm in Podolševa. The Slovene term zijalka or zijavka refers to a flat-bottomed cave with a gaping mouth on a cliff face. Systematic excavations were carried out from 1928 through 1935 by Slovenian archaeologist Srečko Brodar.

Location
Its entry opens toward the south.

Role
There are two explanations of its role. According to the original explanation, the cave was a hunting station. According to the newer one, it was a ritual place.

Excavations
After amateur excavations by Josef Gross, a medical student from Austria, the area was bought by the Museum Society of Celje. Systematic excavations were carried out on its behalf by archaeologist Srečko Brodar, starting in 1928 and continuing until 1935.

The finds from eight layers excavated from the cave included the bones of more than 40 animal species, including cave bears, wolves, alpine marmots, hares, red foxes, weasels, lynx, red deer, and chamois, and muskox teeth, as well as 123 arrowheads and one of the world's oldest sewing needles.

Exhibits
In a village near the cave, a permanent exhibit is open for tourists at the Firšt Inn and Museum in the Logar Valley. The other finds can be seen at the Celje Regional Museum. Unfortunately much of the collection was destroyed during World War II in 1945 Allied bombing raids.

Gallery

See also
 Nevlje

References

External links
 

Limestone caves
Caves of Slovenia
Karawanks
Stone Age sites in Slovenia
Landforms of Styria (Slovenia)